Ferdinand Havlík (17 June 1928 – 28 October 2013) was a Czech composer, and clarinet player. In 1959, Havlík and actor Jiří Suchý co-founded the Semafor musical theater in Prague. Havlík also became Semafor's head composer following the death of Jiří Šlitr in 1969. In addition to Semafor, he worked as a film composer and started a swing band in the 1970s.

Born in Brno, Czechoslovakia, in 1928, Havlík died on October 28, 2013, at the age of 85.

References

Clarinetists
Czech composers
Czech male composers
Czech musical theatre composers
Czech film score composers
Male film score composers
1928 births
2013 deaths